Zayn al-Abidin Sajjad Meerthi (also written as Qazi Zainul Abideen Sajjad Meerthi) (1910–1991) was an Indian Sunni Muslim scholar and historian and head of the Islamic studies department of Jamia Millia Islamia. His book Tarikh-e-Millat is required reading in the syllabus of Darul Uloom Deoband and in madrasas affiliated with it.

Biography
Zayn al-Abidin Sajjad Meerthi was born in 1910 in Meerut, United Provinces of British India. He was schooled at Darul Uloom Meerut and Madrasa Imdad al-Islam in Meerut. He graduated in Arabic literature from Allahabad University and specialized in ahadith at Darul Uloom Deoband under Anwar Shah Kashmiri and Hussain Ahmad Madani in 1346 
AH. He was a disciple of Abdul Mumin Deobandi, who was Mahmud Hasan Deobandi's brother-in-law.

At Tajwar Najibabadi's request, Meerthi became joint editor of Najibabadi's journal Adabi Dunya. He later joined Nadwatul Musannifeen, a publishing house established by Atiqur Rahman Usmani along with Saeed Ahmad Akbarabadi and Hifzur Rehman Seoharwi in Delhi in 1938. Meerthi joined Jamia Millia Islamia as a Professor of History and exegesis at the request of its former Vice Chancellor, Mohammad Mujeeb. He was a member of the executive council of Jamiat Ulama-e-Hind, the administrative council of Nadwatul Ulama, Lucknow and Aligarh Muslim University's Theology faculty. He published Al-Haram, a monthly journal from Meerut, from 1957 to 1964. He  was a member of the governing body of Darul Uloom Deoband from 1962 until his death. Meerthi died in 1991 in Meerut, Uttar Pradesh.

Literary works
Meerthi‘s books include:
 Tarikh-e-Millat, 3 volumes namely Nabi al-Arabi, Khilafat-e-Rashida and Khilafat Banu Umayyah
  Bayan al-Lisan
 Qamoos al-Quran 
 Intikhab-e-Sihah Sitta
 Sirat-e-Tayyibah
 Shaheed-e-Karbala
 Arabi Bol Chaal

References

1910 births
1991 deaths
People from Meerut
University of Allahabad alumni
Deobandis
Academic staff of Jamia Millia Islamia
Indian Sunni Muslim scholars of Islam
Darul Uloom Deoband alumni
Nadwatul Musannifeen
Students of Anwar Shah Kashmiri